A debasement of coinage is the practice of lowering the intrinsic value of coins, especially when used in connection with commodity money, such as gold or silver coins. A coin is said to be debased if the quantity of gold, silver, copper or nickel in the coin is reduced.

Debasement is a practice of governments, and in government debasement, governments make their debased coins legal tender, which is not something private minters can do given that the practice cannot be easily engaged in without a government requiring that people accept debased coins.

Example
In Roman currency, the value of the denarius was gradually decreased over time as the Roman government altered both the size and the silver content of the coin. Originally, the silver used was nearly pure, weighing about 4.5 grams. From time to time, this was reduced. During the Julio-Claudian dynasty, the denarius contained approximately 4 grams of silver, and then was reduced to 3.8 grams under Nero. The denarius continued to shrink in size and purity, until by the second half of the third century, it was only about 2% silver, and was replaced by the Argenteus.

Effects
Debasement lowers the intrinsic value of the coinage and so more coins can be made with the same quantity of precious metal. If done too frequently, debasement may lead to a new coin being adopted as a standard currency, as when the Ottoman akçe was replaced by the kuruş (1 kuruş = 120 akçe), with the para (1/40 kuruş) as a subunit. The kuruş in turn later became a subdivision of the lira.

Methods

 Methods of coin debasement
 The mint starts issuing coins of a certain face value, but with less metal content than previous issues. There will be an incentive to bring the old coins to the mint for re-minting – see Gresham's law. A revenue, called seigniorage, is made on this minting process.

Related uses

"Debasement" is also sometimes used to refer to the tendency of silver or gold coins to be "shaved", that is, to have small amounts shaved off the edges of the coins by unscrupulous users, thereby reducing the actual precious metal content of the coin. In order to prevent this, silver and gold coins began to be produced with milled edges, as many coins still do by tradition, although they no longer contain valuable metals. For example, the U.S. quarter and dime have milled edges. Coins that have traditionally been made purely of base metals, such as the U.S. nickel or the penny, are more likely to have unmilled edges.
By analogy, "debased currency" is sometimes used for anything whose value has been reduced, such as "Stardom is an utterly debased currency"

See also

 Devaluation
 Inflation
 Inflationism
 Inflation hedge
 Financial repression, similar process via different mechanism
 Money burning
 William Wood, center of a political controversy involving the possible debasement of coins

References

External links
Debasement of Coinage at dictionary.cambridge.org

Coins
Currency
Inflation
Monetary economics
Monetary policy

sv:Devalvering